Goldwell is a surname. Notable people with the surname include:

James Goldwell, (d. 1499), a medieval Dean of Salisbury and Bishop of Norwich
Thomas Goldwell (d. 1585), English bishop and the last Catholic bishop of St. Asaph
Thomas Goldwell (prior), the last prior of Christ Church Priory, Canterbury before it was dissolved in the Dissolution of the Monasteries

See also
Goldwell Open Air Museum, outdoor sculpture park near the ghost town of Rhyolite in the U.S. state of Nevada